The Special Engineer Detachment (SED) was a US Army program that identified enlisted personnel with technical skills, such as machining, or who had some science education beyond high school. Those identified were organized into the Special Engineer Detachment, or SED. SED personnel began arriving at Los Alamos in October 1943. By August 1945, 1800 SED personnel worked at Los Alamos. These troops worked in all areas and activities of the Laboratory, including the Trinity Test, and were involved in overseas operations on Tinian.

References

Sources

Further reading

External links
Special Engineer Detachment - "Scientists in Uniform" at childrenofthemanhattanproject.org

Manhattan Project